Eric Koreng (born May 16, 1981 in Stralsund, East Germany) is a beach volleyball player from Germany. Koreng and team mate David Klemperer  represented Germany at the 2008 Summer Olympics in Beijing, China.

References

External links 
 
 
 

1981 births
Living people
German men's beach volleyball players
Beach volleyball players at the 2008 Summer Olympics
Olympic beach volleyball players of Germany
People from Stralsund
Volleyball players from Berlin
Academic staff of Leipzig University